Vatteville is a commune in the Eure department in Normandy in northern France.

The surname "Waterfield" originates from this town.

Population

See also
Communes of the Eure department

References

Communes of Eure